This is a list of diplomatic missions in Trinidad and Tobago. There are currently 29 embassies/high commissions posted in Port of Spain.

\

Embassies/High Commissions in Port of Spain

Gallery of embassies

Non-resident embassies and high commissions

Resident in Brasília, Brazil:

Resident in Caracas, Venezuela:

Resident in Havana, Cuba:

 

Resident in Washington, D.C., United States of America:

Resident in New York City, United States of America:

Resident in other cities:

 (Bogotá)
 (Bridgetown)
 (Kingston)
 (Bogotá)
 (Mexico City)
 (Ottawa)
 (Gros Islet)
 (Oslo)
 (Bridgetown)
 (Ottawa)
 (Georgetown)
 (Kingston)
 (Stockholm)
 (Ottawa)
 (Ottawa)

See also
Foreign relations of Trinidad and Tobago
List of diplomatic missions of Trinidad and Tobago

References

Ministry of Foreign Affairs of Trinidad and Tobago

 
Trinidad and Tobago
Diplomatic missions
Diplomatic missions